The Eyre Peninsula Railway Preservation Society is a historical society located in Port Lincoln, South Australia, which opened in September 1999. It is based at the heritage listed Port Lincoln railway station which it operates as a railway museum.

The museum includes a number of exhibits and collectibles from the Eyre Peninsula Railway including locomotive 850 and a HAN type grain hopper (specifically designed for grain haulage on the network), as well as items from the nearby Coffin Bay Tramway.

References

External links
Official website

Eyre Peninsula
Railway museums in South Australia
1999 establishments in Australia